The year 1857 in architecture involved some significant events.

Events
 September 17 – Official opening of the Municipal Theatre of Santiago, Chile.
 American Institute of Architects (AIA) founded.

Buildings and structures

Buildings completed

 Absecon Lighthouse in Atlantic City, New Jersey, United States, designed by George Meade.
 Ahırkapı Feneri (lighthouse), Istanbul, Turkey, designed by French engineers.
 Britannia Music Hall, Glasgow, Scotland, designed by Thomas Gildard and H. M. McFarlane.
 Old Town Hall, Silkeborg, Denmark, designed by H. C. Zeltner.
 Borujerdis House, Kashan, Persia, designed by Ustad Ali Maryam.
 Pont Saint-Michel, Paris, France, designed by Paul-Martin Gallocher de Lagalisserie and Paul Vaudrey.
 Basilica of Sainte-Clotilde, Paris, France, completed by Théodore Ballu to the design of Franz Christian Gau.
 All Saints' Church, Maidenhead, England, designed and with murals painted by George Edmund Street, with associated school.
 Museum, Trinity College Dublin, Ireland, designed by Thomas Deane and Benjamin Woodward.
 United States Custom House, designed by Ammi B. Young, opens in Providence, Rhode Island
 Zeldenrust, Zuidbarge smock mill, Netherlands.

Awards
 RIBA Royal Gold Medal – Owen Jones.
 Grand Prix de Rome, architecture: Joseph Heim.

Births
 January 18 – William Lethaby, English Arts and Crafts architect and designer (died 1931)
 March 31 – John James Burnet, Scottish architect (died 1938)
 May 28 – Charles Voysey, English Arts and Crafts designer and domestic architect (died 1941)

 July 4 – John Campbell, Scottish architect (died 1942)
 August 12 – Marc Camoletti, Swiss architect (died 1940)
 September 1 – W. D. Caröe, English ecclesiastical architect (died 1938)

Deaths
 March 19 – William Henry Playfair, English-born neoclassical architect working in New Town, Edinburgh (born 1790)
 December 9 – Thomas Oliver, English neoclassical architect working in Newcastle upon Tyne (born 1791)

References

 
Years in architecture
19th-century architecture
Arch
Architecture